Canyon Diablo is a ghost town in Coconino County, Arizona, United States on the edge of the arroyo Canyon Diablo.  The community was settled in 1880 and died out in the early 20th century.

Consequently, the meteorite that struck the crater is officially called the "Canyon Diablo Meteorite."

History

The ramshackle community originated in 1880, due to construction delays attributed to the Atlantic and Pacific Railroad ordering the wrong span length railroad bridge across the canyon. The bridge story is that the original bridge when ordered was not long enough to span Canyon Diablo, and this was only discovered when the bridge arrived on site from the manufacturer. Consequently, for six months the transcontinental railroad ended at the lip of Canyon Diablo while another bridge was manufactured and shipped to the work site.

The original pillars the bridge was mounted on were excavated from the surrounding Kaibab Limestone and shaped on site by Italian stonemasons. The ruins of the lodgings of the railroad workmen are on the west end of the bridge site.  Although the railroad ended at the edge of the canyon, work on the railroad route still progressed.  Crews were sent ahead to survey the route, prepare the grade and bed, cut and prestage railroad ties and other supplies in advance of the iron rails that would accompany the trains once the canyon was spanned when the new bridge arrived.  Work quickly progressed until the A&P crew linked up with the Southern Pacific Railroad crews at Needles, California on August 9, 1883.

Originally a small mobile business community catering to the needs of railroad men, once the railroad stopped at the edge of the canyon this community quickly produced numerous saloons, brothels, dance halls, and gambling houses, all of which remained open 24 hours a day. No lawmen were employed by the community initially, so it quickly became a very dangerous place. Its population was mostly railroad workers, along with passing outlaws, gamblers, and prostitutes. The town was designed with two lines of buildings facing one another across the rock bed main street. The center street, however, was not named Main Street, but "Hell Street". It consisted of fourteen saloons, ten gambling houses, four brothels and two dance halls. Also on this street were two eating counters, one grocery store, and one dry goods store. Scattered about in the vicinity of downtown were large numbers of tents, shotgun houses, and hastily thrown up shacks that served as local residences.

Within a short time the town had 2,000 residents. A regular stagecoach route from Flagstaff to Canyon Diablo began running and was often the victim of robberies. Within its first year, the town received its first marshal. He was sworn in at 3:00pm, and was being buried at 8:00pm that same night. Five more town marshals would follow, the longest lasting one month, and all were killed in the line of duty. A "Boot Hill" cemetery sprouted up at the end of town, which in less than a decade had 35 graves, all of whom had been killed by way of violent death. The 36th grave was that of former trading post owner Herman Wolfe, who died in 1899, the only one to have died a nonviolent death.

Herman Wolfe's trading post was at "Wolfe's Crossing" on the Little Colorado River about 12 miles north of Leupp, Arizona and near a place called Tolchaco. Herman Wolfe died there and his body was transported to Canyon Diablo for burial. Currently Wolfe's grave is heavily monumented and the story is that after World War II a relative from Germany found his grave and installed the headstone and other improvements on the grave site.

When the railroad bridge was completed, the town quickly died. The original railroad bridge was replaced in 1900 with a new bridge to carry heavier locomotives and cars. By 1903, the only thing remaining in the town was a Navajo trading post. A new double track railroad bridge was completed across the Canyon in 1947. What remains today at Canyon Diablo are a few building foundations, the grave marker and grave of Herman Wolfe, the ruins of the trading post, a railroad siding and a double track railroad bridge.

Canyon Diablo's population was 30 in 1890, 29 in 1900,  and 36 in 1920.

Access
Access to Canyon Diablo is north on a very poor road from Exit 230/Two Guns off Interstate 40. A high ground clearance vehicle is recommended.

See also

 Canyon Diablo (canyon)
 Canyon Diablo Shootout

References

 The Santa Fe Route Railroads of Arizona Volume 4 by David F. Myrick, Signature Press 1998

External links

 Canyon Diablo, Arizona, "Wilder than Tombstone"
 Canyon Diablo – ghosttowns.com
 BNSF's Seligman Sub Map and Railfan Info

Ghost towns in Arizona
Former populated places in Coconino County, Arizona
Populated places established in 1882
Geography of the Navajo Nation
Boot Hill cemeteries
Cemeteries in Arizona